Antiotricha cecata is a moth of the subfamily Arctiinae. It was described by Paul Dognin in 1900. It is found in Ecuador.

References

Moths described in 1900
Arctiini
Moths of South America